The 185th Ohio Infantry Regiment, sometimes 185th Ohio Volunteer Infantry (or 185th OVI) was an infantry regiment in the Union Army during the American Civil War.

Service
The 185th Ohio Infantry was organized at Camp Chase in Columbus, Ohio, and mustered in for one year service on February 25, 1865, under the command of Colonel John E. Cummins.

The regiment left Ohio under orders for Nashville, Tennessee, February 27. Detained at Louisville, Kentucky, and assigned to guard duty at various points in Kentucky from Owensboro to Cumberland Gap, with headquarters at Eminence, until September. 1865. Skirmish in Bath County, Kentucky, March 26. Performed garrison duty at Mt. Sterling, Shelbyville, LaGrange, Greensboro, Cumberland Gap, and other locations.

The 185th Ohio Infantry mustered out of service September 26, 1865, at Lexington, Kentucky.

Casualties
The regiment lost a total of 35 enlisted men during service, all due to disease.

Commanders
 Colonel John E. Cummins

See also

 List of Ohio Civil War units
 Ohio in the Civil War

References
 Dyer, Frederick H. A Compendium of the War of the Rebellion (Des Moines, IA:  Dyer Pub. Co.), 1908.
 Ohio Roster Commission. Official Roster of the Soldiers of the State of Ohio in the War on the Rebellion, 1861–1865, Compiled Under the Direction of the Roster Commission (Akron, OH: Werner Co.), 1886–1895.
 Reid, Whitelaw. Ohio in the War: Her Statesmen, Her Generals, and Soldiers (Cincinnati, OH: Moore, Wilstach, & Baldwin), 1868. 
Attribution

External links
 Ohio in the Civil War: 185th Ohio Volunteer Infantry by Larry Stevens
 National flag of the 185th Ohio Infantry

Military units and formations established in 1865
Military units and formations disestablished in 1865
Units and formations of the Union Army from Ohio
1865 establishments in Ohio